Merrie Melodies Starring Bugs Bunny & Friends is an animated anthology television series that aired weekdays in syndication from 1990 to 1992 and on the Fox Kids Network from 1992 to 1994. Originally made to coincide with Bugs Bunny's 50th birthday and the debut of Tiny Toon Adventures, the series featured cartoons from the Looney Tunes and Merrie Melodies library and was distributed by Warner Bros. Domestic Television Distribution.

This series is not to be confused with Warners' earlier syndicated anthology The Merrie Melodies Show.

Format
For the syndicated version of the series, each episode began with a title sequence, directed by Darrell Van Citters, featuring Bugs Bunny and Daffy Duck showing classic cartoon clips on a screen; as usual, Daffy would try to butt in on the action, only for some humorous setback to befall him (five different setups were made, one for each weekday). The show itself ran for a half-hour and contained three classic shorts, one of them starring Bugs Bunny, with a short "Hip Clip" placed in between the second and third shorts. 65 episodes of Merrie Melodies were created and aired in first-run syndication from September 17 to December 14, 1990; reruns aired from then until 1992.

Merrie Melodies moved to the Fox Kids Network in September 1992, which brought forth several changes to the format.  A new animated opening was produced featuring Bugs oversleeping and making a frantic run through the Warner Bros. Studios, passing by several Looney Tunes characters as he makes his way to a soundstage.

Episodes

Season 1
 An asterisk (*) denotes a black-and-white cartoon that was computer-colorized.

References

External links 
 

1990s American animated television series
1990 American television series debuts
1994 American television series endings
1990s American anthology television series
Looney Tunes television series
American children's animated anthology television series
English-language television shows
Television series by Warner Bros. Animation
Television series by Warner Bros. Television Studios
Fox Kids
Bugs Bunny